The 2004 Elite Women's Hockey League season was the first season of the Elite Women's Hockey League, a multi-national women's ice hockey league. The EHV Sabres of Austria won the league title.

Final standings

External links
Season on hockeyarchives.info

Women
European Women's Hockey League seasons
Euro